Boar's Head railway station served the southern part of the village of Standish.

History

A railway route between Wigan and the town of Preston, in the form of the Wigan & Preston Railway, was authorised by Parliament on 22 April 1831; but before it was built, this company amalgamated with the WBR under an Act of 22 May 1834, to form the North Union Railway (NUR) - the first railway amalgamation to be sanctioned by Act of Parliament.

The Lancashire Union Railway route between Wigan and  via  was authorised on 25 July 1864; it opened on 1 November 1869 for goods trains, and one month later, on 1 December, passenger services began. The LUR diverged from the NUR to the south of Boar's Head station, where additional platforms were provided for this route.

The section of the NUR between Parkside and Euxton Junction, which included Boar's Head station, was transferred to the LNWR on 26 July 1889.

The station closed on 31 January 1949.

Routes

References

External links
Boar's Head Station on navigable 1948 O.S. map

Disused railway stations in the Metropolitan Borough of Wigan
Former North Union Railway stations
Railway stations in Great Britain opened in 1838
Railway stations in Great Britain closed in 1949
1838 establishments in England
1949 disestablishments in England
Standish, Greater Manchester